The Afon Alaw is a river on Anglesey (Welsh: Ynys Môn) in Wales which rises near Llanerch-y-medd and flows northwards into the reservoir of Llyn Alaw. Below the dam it then flows southwestwards to the island's west coast near Llanfachraeth. Its lower reaches, west of the A5025 road, are tidal.

References

Rivers of Anglesey
Fjards of Wales